Miguel Arias Cañete (born 24 February 1950) is a Spanish politician who served as European Commissioner for Energy and Climate Action in the Juncker Commission from 2014 and 2019.

A member of the People's Party, Arias served as Minister for Agriculture, Food and Environment in the Government of Spain from 2011 until 2014, before being selected to head his Party List in the European Parliamentary elections.

Early life and education 
Arias Cañete was born to Judge don Alfonso Arias de la Cuesta, and educated in Madrid, first at the Jesuit School at Chamartín before reading Law at the Universidad Complutense.

Career 

After graduating in 1974, he joined the Spanish Civil Service joining the State Lawyers Corps. His first position was in the Spanish Tax Agency at Jerez de la Frontera, before transferring to the Cadiz office. In 1978 he resigned as a civil servant to become a Professor of Law at the University of Cádiz, where he remained until 1982.

Arias entered politics with People's Alliance (AP) in 1982, serving as a member of the Parliament of Andalusia from 1982 until 1986 representing Cádiz. Arias Cañete joined the AP's national executive board during the presidency of Antonio Hernández Mancha. Once Spain joined the European Economic Community on 1 January 1986, he became a member of the European Parliament as delegate appointed by the Cortes Generales, and later, when the first election to the European Parliament took place in Spain in 1987, he was elected MEP. He served until 1999, chairing the Agricultural and Regional Politics Committees. From 1993 until 2000 he served the Spanish Senate, then was appointed as Minister of Agriculture and Fishing by José María Aznar.

Arias Cañete unsuccessfully bid for the Mayorship of Jerez de la Frontera vis-à-vis the 1995 and 1999 local elections, serving as municipal councillor in the opposition from 1995 to 2000. He was then elected Senator representing Cádiz in the Spanish Senate (2000–2004), and from 2004 to 2008 Deputy for Cadiz in the Spanish Congress. 
During the same period, from 2004–2008 he ascended inside the Partido Popular to "Economic Secretary" and president of its Electoral Committee. 
In 2008, he was elected Representative for Madrid in the Spanish Congress and Member of the European Parliament for Electoral District Madrid, which he represented until 2014.

Minister of Agriculture, Food and Environment, 2011–2014
In 2011 Mariano Rajoy appointed Arias as Minister of Agriculture, Food and Environment in the Spanish Government. He had already served as agriculture minister from 200–2004, but the environment was a new brief for him as it was previously dealt with by a separate ministry.

During his time in office, Arias managed to get parliamentary approval of a 2013 law allowing some construction to take place closer to the coast than previously allowed, raising alarm among ecologists and opposition parties, who argued the change could further blight the Mediterranean shoreline.

European Commissioner for Climate Action and Energy, 2014–2019

In 2014, Arias was picked by Rajoy to lead the Partido Popular's list in the 2014 European elections. Following the elections, Spain nominated him for the Juncker Commission in August 2014. By early September, European Commission President Jean-Claude Juncker assigned Arias to the office of European Commissioner for Climate Action and Energy, where he became the first single supervisor of those two policy areas. He took office on 1November 2014. In this capacity, he works under the guidance of Maroš Šefčovič, the European Commission Vice President for Energy Union.

He represented the European Union at international climate negotiations starting at the  2014 United Nations Climate Change Conference in Lima, followed by COP21 in Paris for the signature of the Paris Agreement. Following the agreement, much of his mandate was spent updating EU climate and energy policy to bring it in line with meeting the EU's commitments under the agreement. Cañete also oversaw the introduction of a number of new climate policies during his mandate, including the Effort Sharing Regulation covering non-ETS emissions, a number of transport initiatives, and a regulation on greenhouse gas emissions and removals from land use, land use change and forestry (LULUCF). The LULUCF regulation marked the first time the commitment on LULUCF was enshrined in EU law (although Member States had undertaken the commitment previously). On climate policy, Arias Cañete has been responsible for the plan to introduce an overhaul of the European Union Emission Trading Scheme, the world's biggest cap-and-trade program.

In summer 2015, Arias Cañete launched a plan to turn the Mediterranean region into "a major gas marketplace" as part of European Union efforts to reduce dependency on dominant oil and gas supplier Russia. Shortly after, he brokered an agreement between France, Spain and Portugal on the MidCat gas pipeline intended to increase exports of Algerian gas into the European energy mix.

Later career
In June 2019, Arias Cañete announced his will to put an end to his political career once his mandate as commissioner expired on 1 November 2019, vowing to retire to his home in Jerez de la Frontera and to take care of his grandchildren.

Other activities include:
 Gulbenkian Prize for Humanity, Member of the Jury
 Balam Agriculture, Independent Member of the Board of Directors (since 2021)

Controversies
Arias has faced accusations of conflicts of interests regarding his business interests and his political posts. While serving as a member of the European Parliament’s Committee on Agriculture and Rural Development, he allegedly held interests in several agricultural businesses, leading the Spanish newspaper El País to describe him in 2014 as always being on the edge of a conflict of interest. In 2014, the environmental group Friends of the Earth and anticorruption group Corporate Europe Observatory criticised his nomination to the Climate Action and Energy portfolio due to his family's involvement in the oil industry.

Furthermore, Arias was called to give evidence before the Provincial Court of Barcelona over a friend's alleged laundering of 2 billion pesetas.

Arias was accused of sexism after Arias and his Socialist rival Elena Valenciano were featured in Spanish television's first live debate between the country’s leading candidates for a European Parliament election in May 2014, Valenciano was widely perceived to have beaten him in the debate. Asked to explain his poor performance in the debate, he pointed to the fact that he was facing a woman: "If you abuse your intellectual superiority, you come across like a macho who is pushing a defenceless woman into a corner".

In September 2014, Arias sold two large shareholdings in oil companies Petrolífera Ducar and Petrologis Canarias to appease parliamentarians threatening to reject his confirmation as European Commissioner because of conflicts of interest. Also, his son resigned from their boards. As of October 2014 more than half a million people signed an Avaaz petition calling for Aria's rejection.

The Panama papers in 2016 revealed that his wife's world-renowned  bull operations, managed by their two sons, Pablo and Juan Pedro, and co-owned by her siblings, received well over $1 million in farm subsidies and her other farm, forestry and winery businesses also received EU subsidies.

Panamanian Rinconada Investments Group SA was an offshore investment company registered in 2005, listed as inactive in January 2010, which Deutsche Bank Geneva, Swiss-based financial services company Gestrust SA and Mossack Fonseca helped to create. Arias' wife and the Domecq family are politically exposed persons and were empowered to approve transactions.

Personal life 
Arias, from a Spanish gentry family, is married to Micaela Domecq y Solís-Beaumont by whom he has four children. His wife's aristocratic family has long been established in the Jerez de la Frontera region of Andalusia, where they own large farming and livestock estates including the breeding of fighting bulls and have given their name to a world-famous brand of fortified wines.

Recognition 
  Grand Cross of the Order of Charles III (2004)
  Grand Cross of the Order of Civil Merit (2011)
  Chevalier, Ordre du Mérite agricole
  Knight, Sovereign Military Order of Malta

References

|-

|-

|-

|-

|-

1950 births
Agriculture ministers of Spain
Complutense University of Madrid alumni
Knights of Malta
Knights of the Order of Agricultural Merit
Living people
Members of the 8th Congress of Deputies (Spain)
Members of the 9th Congress of Deputies (Spain)
Members of the 1st Parliament of Andalusia
Members of the Senate of Spain
MEPs for Spain 1986–1987
MEPs for Spain 1987–1989
MEPs for Spain 1989–1994
MEPs for Spain 2014–2019
People's Party (Spain) MEPs
Politicians from Madrid
Spanish European Commissioners
Academic staff of the University of Cádiz
Members of the State Lawyers Corps
European Commissioners 2014–2019